Kemei is a name of Kenyan origin that may refer to:

William Kemei (born 1969), Kenyan middle-distance runner and 1991 All-Africa Games champion
Philemon Kemei (born 1982), Kenyan long-distance runner and 2004 Lisbon Marathon winner

See also
Kipkemei, related Kenyan name meaning "son of Kemei"

Kalenjin names